Oliver Sin (born 18 May 1985) is a Hungarian artist.

Early life and education 

Born in Budapest, Hungary, Oliver Sin was raised with his sister Judit by his father, Zoltan Sin, a ropemaker. He became interested in art and science from an early age. He studied visual art from 2003 to 2009 at Dunakeszi's Miklós Radnóti Gymnasium. After graduation Sin enrolled in Szombathely's University of West Hungary where he majored in Visual Arts and Croatian.

Career 

Sin' work first came to international attention after his collaboration with Fibenare Guitars Co., when they made the Fibenare - Oliver Sin Collaboration Guitar in 2012. He made the cover of Guitar Connoisseur Magazine (in New York, USA) in 2013.

Exhibitions

2009 

 Budapest (Hungary), Bakelit Multi Art Center

2010 

 Budapest (Hungary), Pszinapszis XIV

2012 

 Érd, City Gallery (Hungary), Ez van!
 Budapest (Hungary), Syma Centre, Decoration Society Contest II.
 Budapest (Hungary), FN5, Millenáris
 Vác (Hungary), Exhibition of the Contemporary Values II. K.É.K.
 Budapest (Hungary), Bakelit Multi Art Center
 Budapest (Hungary), Abszurd Flikk-Flakk, Alle Center
 Budapest (Hungary), Bakelit Pályázat 2nd Exhibition, Fogasház Kulturális Befogadótér
 Budapest (Hungary), Honoratus Kodály Zoltán, MOM Kulturális Központ

2013 

 Los Angeles (USA), NAMM Show / Fibenare
 Szentendre (Hungary), Budapest Art Expo Fresh VI.- International Biennial Of Young Artists
 Erzsébetliget (Hungary), Art Feszt VI.
 Újpalota (Hungary), In-Spirál Ház, Zsókavár Gallery
 Vác (Hungary), Light / Fény – Napfesztivál, Art Lavina Gallery
 Budapest (Hungary), ARC 13.
 Warsaw (Poland), Perfectionists / MODESSQE 1st, Skwer

2014 

 Anaheim (USA), California, NAMM Show with Fibenare Guitars Co.
 Kraków (Poland), Pracownia pod Baranami (MODESSQE)
 Budapest (Hungary), My Brain Is Open, Serpenyős
 Cambridge (USA), Central Elements Cambridge Science Festival (MIT)

Collections 

Sin's work is in private and public collections such as MODESSQE (Poland).

Illustrations 

 2013 April, October Guitar Connoisseur (New York, USA) / covers
 2013 September Endre Dicsőfi: Nyitnikék (HU) / cover, illustrations
 2013 October Korunk (Cluj-Napoca, Romania) / cover, illustrations

References

External links 

  Oliver Sin official website
 Yareah Magazine Art of Oliver Sin
 Kaltblut Magazine Oliver Sin! Hungarian Art!
 Art4th Zine Oliver Sin, Visual Artist
 ARClap Oliver Sin, Borz-award interview (Hungarian)

Hungarian painters
1985 births
Living people
Artists from Budapest
Contemporary painters
Hungarian contemporary artists
Mathematical artists
Conceptual artists